Lieutenant General Apoorva Kumar Sengupta  (3 August 1938 – 14 September 2013) was an Indian army officer and cricketer who played in one Test in 1959.

Cricket career
Sengupta's Test appearance came in the middle of a major controversy in Indian cricket. Ghulam Ahmed announced his retirement a few days before the Madras Test against the West Indies in 1958-59, and Vijay Manjrekar dropped out due to an injury. This led to a confusing situation where Jasu Patel, A. G. Kripal Singh, Manohar Hardikar and Sengupta were all considered. The captain Polly Umrigar wanted Hardikar but when the President of the BCCI insisted that he pick Patel, Umrigar resigned the night before the match. In the end, Sengupta and Kripal Singh played. Sengupta was dismissed for 1 and 8 by Wes Hall and Roy Gilchrist.

Sengupta was a 'very good allrounder, right hand opening batsman, leg-break and googly bowler and slip field'. He had made his first-class debut earlier in that season for Services against the West Indian touring team, scoring 32 and 100 not out. Two months later he took 6 for 32 against Delhi on his first appearance in the Ranji Trophy. These two performances had led to his selection for the Test match. He continued to play first-class cricket for ten years. His only other hundred was 146 not out scored against Bombay in the 1959-60 Ranji Trophy semi-final.

Military career
Sengupta served as an officer in the Indian army and was awarded PVSM and AVSM. He rose to the rank of Lieutenant General (3 star). He was also selected to serve as the defense attache for USA and Canada, based in Washington DC.

After retiring from the Indian army, he lived with his wife Meena Sengupta in New Delhi. They had two children, Amitabh and Surojit Sengupta. Sengupta died in the R&R hospital in New Delhi on 14 September 2013.

References

External links
 Cricinfo profile
 CricketArchive profile
 "Apoorva Sengupta: A baffling Test career"

Sengupta, AK
Sengupta, AK
Sengupta, AK
Sengupta, AK
Services cricketers
North Zone cricketers
Indian generals
Cricketers from Lucknow